The Zhob Valley Railway was one of several branch lines in Pakistan, operated and maintained by Pakistan Railways. The line began at Bostan Junction and ended at Zhob. Upon competition, the  railway became the longest narrow gauge system in the region.

History
The Zhob Valley Railway was built in two sections between 1916 and 1920. The first section was built from Boston Junction to Muslimbagh during World War I by the Balochistan Chrome Ore Company and opened in 1916. Muslimbagh had and abundance of Chromite and was transported by the railway to munitions production factories in the British Empire. The second section was built by the North Western State Railway as an extension from Muslimbagh to Fort Sandeman (now Zhob). Work began in 1920 and reached Qila Saifullah in 1927 and Zhob in 1930. The intent to extend the railway from Zhob to Bannu, but never materialized. At 2224 meters above the sea, Kan Mehtarzai railway station would become one of the highest narrow gauge railway stations in the world. During winter months, the line could be buried by snow.

Closure
The line was closed down in 1991 after successive operational losses and was later dismantled completely.

Revival
The line is proposed to be rebuilt as a  broad gauge line under the China-Pakistan Economic Corridor as part of a new railway link between Kotla Jam and Quetta.

Stations
Bostan Junction
Khanai
Churmian
Kan Mehtarzai
Muslimbagh
Kila Saifullah
Alozai
Badinzai
Zhob

References

Notes

Bibliography

External links
Zhob Valley Railway Survey c early 1890s,  page 98 Some Rambles of a Sapper by  Brigr-Genl. Herbert Henry Austin. 1928 Hathi Trust Digital Library
L/PS/11/168, P 994/1920; “P 994/1920 Baluchistan: communications in the Zhob valley; proposal for a broad-gauge railway from Hindubagh to Fort Sandeman”; 1 Sep 1919-23 Mar 1920

Closed railway lines in Pakistan
Railway lines opened in 1929
2 ft 6 in gauge railways in Pakistan
Railway lines closed in 1986
Railway stations on Zhob Valley Railway Line